Thomas Tingey Craven may refer to:

 Thomas Tingey Craven (admiral, born 1808) (1808–1887), United States Navy officer who served in the Civil War
 Thomas Tingey Craven (admiral, born 1873) (1873–1950), United States Navy officer who served in World War I and World War II, grandson of the above